Mauro Faccio Gonçalves (January 18, 1934 — March 18, 1990), known artistically as Zacarias Gonçalves or simply Zacarias, was a Brazilian actor, notable for being a member of the comedic group Os Trapalhões. He was born in Sete Lagoas.

Cause of death
In December 1989, Zacarias started taking weight loss medicines without medical supervision. He quickly lost at least 19 kg (42 lbs), but this affected his health, and he succumbed to a lung infection. At the time, the sudden weight loss led to widespread rumors (including a headline in tabloid Notícias Populares) that he had died of AIDS. However, his family maintains to this day that this was not the case. He died in Rio de Janeiro.

Television
Tribunal de Calouros (TV Itacolomi, 1963)
Café Sem Concerto (TV Tupi)
Os Trapalhões (TV Tupi, 1974–1977)
Os Trapalhões (TV Globo, 1977–1990)
Criança Esperança (TV Globo, 1986–1989)

Discography
1975: Os Trapalhões – Volume 2
1979: Os Trapalhões na TV
1981: O Forró dos Trapalhões
1981: Os Saltimbancos Trapalhões
1982: Os Vagabundos Trapalhões
1982: Os Trapalhões na Serra Pelada
1983: O Cangaceiro Trapalhão
1984: O Trapalhão na Arca de Noé
1984: Os Trapalhões e o Mágico de Oroz
1984: Os Trapalhões
1985: A Filha dos Trapalhões
1987: Os Trapalhões
1988: Os Trapalhões

Filmography

Solo
1971: Tô na Tua, Ô Bicho
1975: O Fraco do Sexo Forte
1977: Deu a Louca nas Mulheres

with Mussum and Dedé Santana
1983: Atrapalhando a Suate

with Os Trapalhões
1978: Os Trapalhões na Guerra dos Planetas as himself
1979: O Rei e os Trapalhões as Abil
1979: O Cinderelo Trapalhão as himself
1980: Os Três Mosqueteiros Trapalhões as himself
1980: O Incrível Monstro Trapalhão
1981: Os Saltimbancos Trapalhões
1982: Os Vagabundos Trapalhões
1982: Os Trapalhões na Serra Pelada as himself
1983: O Cangaceiro Trapalhão
1984: Os Trapalhões e o Mágico de Oróz as Scarecrow
1984: A Filha dos Trapalhões as himself
1985: Os Trapalhões no Reino da Fantasia as himself
1986: Os Trapalhões no Rabo do Cometa
1986: Os Trapalhões e o Rei do Futebol as himself
1987: Os Trapalhões no Auto da Compadecida
1987: Os Fantasmas Trapalhões as himself
1988: Os Heróis Trapalhões - Uma Aventura na Selva as himself
1988: O Casamento dos Trapalhões
1989: A Princesa Xuxa e os Trapalhões as Zacaling
1989: Os Trapalhões na Terra dos Monstros as himself (final film role)

Notes

External links
 Zacarias at IMDb

Os Trapalhões
1934 births
1990 deaths
Brazilian male comedians
AIDS-related deaths in Rio de Janeiro (state)
20th-century Brazilian male actors
20th-century comedians